Styloceras is a genus of shrubs and trees in the family Buxaceae. It is native to South America.

Taxonomy
The following species are currently recognized:
Styloceras brokawii A.H.Gentry & R.B.Foster
Styloceras columnare Müll.Arg.
Styloceras connatum Torrez & P.Jørg.
Styloceras kunthianum A.Juss.
Styloceras laurifolium (Willd.) Kunth
Styloceras penninervium A.H.Gentry & G.A.Aymard

References

 
Eudicot genera
Taxonomy articles created by Polbot